A Spectre Haunts Europe is a 1923 Soviet silent horror film directed by Vladimir Gardin and written by Georgi Tasin. It was made by the Ukrainian Soviet Socialist Republic's production company VUFKU. It is based on Edgar Allan Poe's 1842 short story The Masque of the Red Death. The film features a massacre on the Odessa Steps which may have served as an inspiration for the more famous scene in Sergei Eisenstein's Battleship Potemkin. The film's sets were designed by the art director Vladimir Yegorov. Cameraman Boris Zavalev filmed the movie on location in Crimea. Many reference sources list the film as 1921, but it was actually only released in 1922.

This is one of the few silent horror films ever made in Russia, the other notable titles being The Queen of Spades (1910 and 1916) and The Vij (1908 and 1916).

Plot
The conceited leader of an unnamed European nation comes across a young shepherdess while walking outdoors. He falls in love with her, but Fate has preordained that he must suffer because of the way he has enslaved and mistreated his people. The girl's father turns out to be the leader of a band of revolutionaries who are seeking to overthrow the despot. The plot does not closely follow the Edgar Allan Poe short story at all.

Cast
 Zoya Barantsevich 
 Oleg Frelikh 
 Evgeniy Gryaznov 
 Lidiya Iskritskaya-Gardina 
 Ivan Kapralov 
 Vasili Kovrigin 
 Iona Talanov 
 Karl Tomski 
 Vladimir Yegorov

References

Bibliography 
 Taylor, Richard. Battleship Potemkin: The Film Companion. I.B.Tauris, 2001.

External links 
 

1923 films
Soviet silent feature films
1920s Russian-language films
Films based on works by Edgar Allan Poe
Films directed by Vladimir Gardin
Soviet black-and-white films
Soviet horror films
1923 horror films
Silent horror films
1920s rediscovered films
Rediscovered Soviet films